HRNK Zmaj is a professional Croatian football club based in the town of Makarska.

History 
HRNK Zmaj was founded in 1921. The first club president was Tonči Vuzio. From 1993 to 1996 club wore a sponsor name NK Zmaj-Euroherc.

Achievements 
HRNK Zmaj became a member in the regional subassociation in 1922. In 1949 the town won the Dalmatian Cup. It was three times a champion in the regional subassociation. In the 1954–55 it participated in qualifying for entry in the 2nd league, but failed. In 1968–69 the club achieved its greatest success playing in the former second National League – South, but managed to play only one season.

Current squad

External links 
HNK Zmaj Makarska at Nogometni magazin 
HRNK Zmaj Makarska at Facebook 

Football clubs in Croatia
Football clubs in Split-Dalmatia County
Association football clubs established in 1921
1921 establishments in Croatia